Type 512 radar is the Chinese license-produced Soviet Zarnitsa naval radar that has been withdrawn from service in Chinese navy.

The production of the Type 512 started in the late 1950s. The radar operates as a surface search and navigational radar on board naval vessel. Produced by the State Factory N. 720 in Nanjing. It was the only naval radar produced by China at the time. Type 512 radar is mainly installed on small vessels such as torpedo boats, missile boats, or gunboats, and some Chinese naval auxiliaries. The 80-kW radar operates at S-band and has an effective range of 20km.  Type 512 has been replaced on the 1980s for more advanced radars, after more than three decades of service in the Chinese navy.

See also
Chinese radars
Naval Weaponry of the People's Liberation Army Navy

References

Sea radars
Military radars of the People's Republic of China